Super Sharanya is a 2022 Indian Malayalam-language coming-of-age comedy film written and directed by Girish A. D. The film stars Anaswara Rajan in the titular role while Arjun Ashokan, Mamitha Baiju and Naslen K. Gafoor plays supporting roles. The film was produced by Shebin Backer and Girish A. D. and the music was composed by Justin Varghese. The film was released on 7 January 2022 to mixed reviews but was commercially successful.

Synopsis
Sharanya goes to engineering college and becomes friends with her roommates. A professor, a senior, and a classmate likes her and she rejects or shows her displeasure with them. She finds romance with a young adult, Deepu through Instagram. She met him accidentally while roaming through Ernakulam and he tracked down her profile. Sharanya and her friends' campus life and evolving character traits are captured throughout the story.

Cast 

 Anaswara Rajan as Sharanya Vasudevan / "Super Sharanya"/ Shaaru
Arjun Ashokan as Deepu
 Mamitha Baiju as Sona Thomas/"Sona Re"
 Naslen K. Gafoor as Sangeeth
 Vineeth Vishwam as Assistant Professor Arun Raj
 Sajin Cherukayil as Abhilash Kumar, Deepthi's husband
 Vineeth Vasudevan as Ajith Menon
 Varun Dhara as Varun
 Antony Varghese as Sumeshettan (cameo appearance)
 Manikandan Pattambi as Vasudevan (Sharanya's father)
 Bindhu Panicker as Deepu's mother
 Rosna Joshi as Sherin
 Kani Kusruti (cameo appearance)
 Devika Gopal Nair as Devika
 Sneha Babu as Deepthi, Deepu's sister
 Shiny Sarah
 Sanath Sivaraj as Sudhi
 Jimmy Danny as Jimmy
 Aravind E. Haridas as Sanju
 Jyothy Vijayakumar
 Sreekanth Vettiyar as Justin
 Femina as HoD
 Sanovar T.K.
 Anagha Biju
 Keerthana Sreekumar
 Parvathy Ayyappan as Navya
 Subin Tarzan

Production 
Super Sharanya was announced in August 2020 as Gireesh A. D.'s second directorial after Thanneer Mathan Dinangal with Anaswara Rajan and Arjun Ashokan in lead roles. Kunchacko Boban shared the first look character posters of the film. A second-look poster has been revealed by the filmmakers, announcing the January 2022 release of the film in theatres. Shebin Backer is producing the film, which is co-produced by Girish A. D.. Sajith Purushan did the cinematography, while Akash Joseph Vargheese did the editing. Justin Varghese, who was also the composer of Thanneer Mathan Dinangal composed the music. The film's production was stated to begin in April 2020 but instead started in December 2020 due to the Covid outbreak.

Music

Release
The film was released on 7 January 2022.

Critical response
Times Of India gave it a rating of 3/5 and wrote " A college story too caught up in its own cuteness ".  Indian Express wrote, " A few narrative flourishes notwithstanding, the film tells the same love story all over again. It never explains its title either." The News Minute gave a rating of 3/5 and wrote, "Starts promisingly but deviates from the plot".

References

External links 

2020s Malayalam-language films
2022 films
Films shot in Thrissur
2022 comedy-drama films
Indian comedy-drama films